The 2005 Seattle mayoral election took place November 8, 2005. Incumbent Mayor Greg Nickels was reelected to a second term. As of 2022, this is the most recent Seattle mayoral election in which the incumbent was re-elected to a second term.

Primary
The primary was held September 20, 2005.

General election
The general election was held November 8.

References

Seattle
2005
Seattle mayoral
Seattle mayoral